Justin A. Johnson (born August 9, 1985) is an American professional stock car racing driver. He has raced in the NASCAR Gander Outdoors Truck Series and NASCAR K&N Pro Series West.

Racing career
A Las Vegas native, Johnson grew up competing at the Las Vegas Motor Speedway's Bullring. By 2019, he held over 50 race victories that placed him in the top five all-time among Bullring race winners; he also won championships in the Thunder Cars and USLCI Bandolero Outlaws classes.

In 2010, he won the Pepsi One Super Late Model championship at Irwindale Event Center. During the season, he made his NASCAR K&N Pro Series West debut at the track with Vision Aviation Racing, finishing 24th after being collected in a crash with Brandon Davis on lap 119. The following year, he joined VAR's NASCAR Camping World Truck Series program, which had recently merged with Billy Ballew Motorsports, racing alongside Dusty Davis. Johnson ran four races in 2011 for VAR, recording a top-ten finish at Phoenix International Raceway.

Eight years after his last start in the series, Johnson returned to the Truck Series in 2019 for the World of Westgate 200 at Las Vegas. He failed to qualify in the No. 08 for Kart Idaho Racing, but was able to participate in the race after Reaume Brothers Racing's Jesse Iwuji crashed in qualifying; although Iwuji's No. 34 team was guaranteed a spot in the race on owners' points, RBR did not have a backup truck available. Johnson provided his No. 08 truck, which was renumbered to No. 34 for the race. After starting last, he finished 23rd.

Personal life
In addition to racing competitively, Johnson works for the Ron Fellows Performance Driving School in Pahrump, Nevada.

Motorsports career results

NASCAR
(key) (Bold – Pole position awarded by qualifying time. Italics – Pole position earned by points standings or practice time. * – Most laps led.)

Gander Outdoors Truck Series

K&N Pro Series West

 Season still in progress
 Ineligible for series points

References

External links
 

Living people
1985 births
Racing drivers from Las Vegas
Sportspeople from Las Vegas
NASCAR drivers
Racing drivers from Nevada